Scopula bifalsaria is a moth of the family Geometridae. It was described by Prout in 1913. It is endemic to China.

Subspecies
Scopula bifalsaria bifalsaria (western China)
Scopula bifalsaria falsificata Prout, 1934 (Tibet)

References

Moths described in 1913
bifalsaria
Moths of Asia
Taxa named by Louis Beethoven Prout